Jefferson Ruan Pereira dos Santos (born 30 December 1999), commonly known as Jeffinho, is a Brazilian professional footballer who plays as a forward for Ligue 1 club Lyon.

Career

Resende
Jeffinho began his career at Resende after playing youth football for Pelé Academia, which had a partnership with the club. He made his first team debut on 28 June 2020, coming on as a second-half substitute and scoring his team's second in a 2–0 Campeonato Carioca away win over Madureira.

Jeffinho continued to feature sparingly for Resende before moving to Gama on loan for the 2021 Série D. Back to his parent club, he impressed during the 2022 Carioca.

Botafogo
On 12 April 2022, Jeffinho moved to Botafogo on loan; initially assigned to the B-team, Jeffinho was called up to the first team squad of Bota by manager Luís Castro in June 2022. He made his main squad – and Série A – debut on 19 June, replacing Renzo Saravia late into a 3–2 away success over Internacional.

On 26 August 2022, Jeffinho signed a permanent three-year contract with Bota.

Lyon
On 31 January 2023, Jeffinho joined Ligue 1 club Lyon for a fee of €10 million, signing a contract until June 2027 with the French club.

Career statistics

References

External links
Profile at the Olympique Lyonnais website

1999 births
Living people
People from Volta Redonda
Brazilian footballers
Association football forwards
Campeonato Brasileiro Série A players
Campeonato Brasileiro Série D players
Ligue 1 players
Resende Futebol Clube players
Sociedade Esportiva do Gama players
Botafogo de Futebol e Regatas players
Olympique Lyonnais players
Brazilian expatriate footballers
Brazilian expatriate sportspeople in France
Expatriate footballers in France